Andre Dyson (born May 25, 1979) is a former American football cornerback. He was drafted by the Tennessee Titans in the second round of the 2001 NFL Draft. He played college football at Utah.

Early years
Andre Dyson was born on May 25, 1979, in Las Vegas, Nevada. He grew up most of his life in Clinton, Utah, and attended West Clinton Elementary School.  He also attended Syracuse Junior High School, and Clearfield High School. While attending Clearfield, Dyson lettered in football, soccer, and basketball. In football, as a senior, he was named the team's Defensive Most Valuable Player, and was an All-Region selection, an All-Area selection, and an All-State selection. In soccer, he was a second-team All-State selection.

Professional career

Dyson received the NFC defensive player of the week in 2005 for his performance on Monday Night Football in week 13. Dyson returned both an interception (72 yards) and fumble (25 yards) for touchdowns in a 42-0 Seattle Seahawks win against the Philadelphia Eagles on December 5, 2005. On February 26, 2008, the New York Jets released him.

Coaching
Dyson coached cornerbacks at Weber State, in Ogden, Utah. coached football at Clearfield High School in Clearfield, Utah.

Personal
Dyson is the younger brother of former NFL wide receiver and Titans teammate Kevin Dyson. They were the first brothers in NFL history to score touchdowns in the same game.

References

External links
New York Jets bio 
Weber State Bio

1979 births
Living people
Sportspeople from Logan, Utah
African-American players of American football
American football cornerbacks
Utah Utes football players
Tennessee Titans players
Seattle Seahawks players
New York Jets players
People from Davis County, Utah
21st-century African-American sportspeople
20th-century African-American sportspeople